Keith Brigham McMullin (born August 18, 1941) has been the CEO of Deseret Management Corporation since April 2012.

McMullin is a prominent leader of the Church of Jesus Christ of Latter-day Saints (LDS Church) and has been a general authority since 1995.  He was the second counselor in the presiding bishopric of the LDS Church from 1995 to 2012, at which time he was designated an emeritus general authority of the church.

McMullin was born in St. George, Utah and is a banking and finance graduate of the University of Utah. He worked for the Ford Motor Company as an investment and financial analyst and also managed several small businesses. In 2016 McMullin was elected chairman of the board of governors for the Salt Lake Chamber.

LDS Church service
Prior to his call as a general authority, McMullin served as a mission president in Germany, where he also served as an LDS Church missionary as a young man. McMullin has also served in the church as a bishop and stake president. Prior to his call to the Presiding Bishopric, he served as managing director of the church's Welfare Services Department for ten years.

Personal life
McMullin married Carolyn Jean Gibbs McMullin and they are the parents of eight children.

See also 
 Council on the Disposition of the Tithes
 Richard C. Edgley

References

External links
Keith B. McMullin: Latter-day Saint official profile

1941 births
20th-century Mormon missionaries
American Mormon missionaries in Germany
American general authorities (LDS Church)
Counselors in the Presiding Bishopric (LDS Church)
Latter Day Saints from Utah
Living people
Mission presidents (LDS Church)